Gabâ or gabaa, for the people in many parts of the [cebu] particularly among Visayans, is the concept of a non-human and non-divine, imminent retribution. A sort of negative karma, it is generally seen as an evil effect on a person because of their wrongdoings or transgressions. The word has later been recycled for translating "divine retribution" or "divine fury" in the translations of the Bible to many local dialects in the Philippines. It is also translated as nemesis. The opposite of "Gaba" is Grasya, literally Grace in Spanish, which pertains to blessings from the Heavens.

Background 

The gabâ can be characterized through various Cebuano proverbs:

 It is not necessarily immediate in its effect. (Ang gabâ dili sama sa sili nga mohalang dayon.)
 It may come unexpectedly. (Ang gabâ dili magsaba.)
 It is not limited to transgressions against fellow human beings: objects considered holy can also cause gabâ, such as dropping on the ground a sacred root crop of ubi. (The concept was later extended to religious icons such as bibles or rosaries). Even the least-valued object may cause it. (Bisan ang ube makagabâ.)
 It could happen to persons who are important to the transgressor. For example, people would say "gigabâan" of a womanizing father whose daughter has a child out of wedlock.

Sources 

The source of gabâ is not a god or God or an absolute karmic principle, but in the spirits of nature. It must have arisen out of the animism of pre-Spanish Cebuanos. With the coming of Christianity into the Islands, gabâ became "absorbed" in the Roman Catholic Church. In-depth examination, however, would show that it is incompatible with Catholic dogma.

Applications

Gabâ and panghimaraot 

Gabâ is distinct from panghimaraot (curse) whereby a transgressed person pronounces a maldesyon against the transgressor. In panghimaraot, evil is asked to befall on the sinner; with gabâ, evil is sure to befall on the sinner, even if it is not asked. Sometimes Cebuanos blurt out threats of gabâ, "Gabâ-an ka gyod!", but it is not taken to mean that gabâ is being asked; it is only a reminder to the transgressor that no one is excluded from it. Sometimes sinners also ask for exclusion in pidgin Spanish: Puyra gabâ! (Fuera gabâ)

Gabâ and karma 

Gabâ is not synonymous with the Hindu-Buddhist law of karma: gabâ is only in the negative (a punishment), unlike karma which may be good or bad. Both concepts are known to the Visayan peoples, although gabâ is considered purely indigenous, while karma was historically imported.

 Gabâ and divine retribution

Gabâ is not, strictly speaking, the same as punishment from a godhead, such as the monotheisms' God or the Greek goddess Nemesis: gabâ does not presuppose an Ultimate Being.

Ill-doings to one's fellowmen does not alone cause Gaba but actions like wasting food, disrespecting elders, abusing animals, desecrating holy places or objects, cursing God, and destroying Nuno sa Punso cause Gaba as well. An expression is also common among the Bisaya and Hiligaynon, Purya Gaba which is said when one walks in an eerie place, this is believed to ward off evil.

Social effects 

Some sociologists believe that Gabâ is one of the causes of the complacency of Cebuanos: because of their belief in it, they prefer to be silent on abuses. It gives hope to the oppressed that someday the abuses will be paid for.

See also 

Anito
Karma in Buddhism
Philippine mythology

References 

 Fernandez, Guiraldo C., "The Understanding of Gabâ and its Relation to the Doctrine of Karma", USC Graduate Journal, University of San Carlos (Cebu City), 2004. Vol XXI, No. 1, pp. 33–45. Online: http://research.usc.edu.ph/research_journals/tools/process_specific_request.jsp?table=theses&search=4
 Garcia, Lilian, "Some Observations of the Gabâ Phenomena", Philippine Quarterly of Culture and Society, 1976. Vol. XV, No. 1, pp. 309–410.
 Lomoljo, Luz, "Gabâ in the Christian Perspective: Suggested Themes for Religious Education", unpublished master's thesis, University of San Carlos, 1994.

Cebuano culture
Visayan mythology
Religion in the Philippines
Austronesian spirituality